Francis Mahoney may refer to:
 Francis Mahoney (basketball), American basketball player
 Francis J. Mahoney, American lawyer and politician from New York
 Francis X. Mahoney, American politician, member of the Illinois House of Representatives

See also
 Francis Sylvester Mahony, Irish humorist and journalist
 Frank P. Mahony (Francis Prout Mahony), Australian painter, watercolorist and illustrator